This list comprises all players who have participated in at least one league match for Orlando City since the team's first season in the USL Professional Division in 2011. Players who were on the roster but never played a first team game are not listed.

A "†" denotes players who only appeared in a single match.

A
  Jean Alexandre (2012–2013)
  Wes Allen (2011–2012)
  Yordany Álvarez (2011, 2014)

B
  Kieron Bernard (2011–2013)
  Luke Boden (2011–2014)
  Renan Boufleur (2013)
  Freddie Braun (2013)
  Bryan Burke (2013–2014)

C
  Charlie Campbell (2011–2012)
  Darwin Cerén (2014)
  Dennis Chin (2011–2014)
  Ian Christianson (2014)
  Justin Clark (2012–2014)

D
  Austin da Luz (2014)
  Kyle Davies (2012)
  George Davis IV (2012)
  Oumar Diakhité (2013) †
  Christian Duke (2013)
  Dom Dwyer (2013)

E
  Kevin Ellis (2013)
  Estrela (2014)

F
  Brian Fekete (2013)
  Justin Fojo (2011)
  Ian Fuller (2011–2013)

G
  Miguel Gallardo (2011–2014)
  Giuseppe Gentile (2014)
  Maxwell Griffin (2011–2012)

H
  Harrison Heath (2014)
  Corey Hertzog (2014)

J
  Bitielo Jean Jacques (2014)
  Mechack Jérôme (2011–2012)
  Devorn Jorsling (2011)

K
  Sean Kelley (2011–2013)
  Jon Kempin (2013)

L
  Mikey Lopez (2014)
  Rodrigo López (2012)
  Matt Luzunaris (2011–2012)

M
  Adama Mbengue (2012–2014)
  Jonathan Mendoza (2013)
  Kevin Molino (2011–2014)

N
  Lewis Neal (2011)

O
  James O'Connor (2012–2014)
  Lawrence Olum (2011)

P
  Anthony Pulis (2012–2014)

Q
  Aodhan Quinn (2014)

R
  Rafael Ramos (2014)
  Tommy Redding (2014)
  John Rooney (2012)
  Brad Rusin (2014)

S
  C. J. Sapong (2013)
  Yann Songo'o (2013)
  Brian Span (2014)
  Demar Stewart (2011)

T
  Long Tan (2013)
  Michael Tetteh (2011)
  Jack Traynor (2011)
  Tyler Turner (2014)

U
  Erik Ustruck (2011–2013)

V
  Rob Valentino (2011–2014)

W
  Jamie Watson (2011–2013)
  Carl Woszczynski (2014)

References

Orlando City
 
Association football player non-biographical articles